is a Japanese anime producer and anime entrepreneur, the co-founder of Madhouse, as well as the founder of MAPPA and Studio M2. He is the current chairman of MAPPA and president of Studio M2.

Maruyama has been involved in the Japanese animation business for more than 50 years.

He has worked with many well-known and up-and-coming animators, established several animation production companies, worked on dozens of series and films and planned and produced various works.

Maruyama is one of the most experienced producers in the Japanese animation industry, and has given opportunities to individuals who went on to become accomplished directors in their own right.
Among the talents he picked up were Satoshi Kon, Mamoru Hosoda, and Sunao Katabuchi. He also gave Masaaki Yuasa and Mitsuo Iso a chance to direct at a very early stage.
He also gave Mamoru Hosoda, who was thinking of returning to his hometown to change careers after he was forced to drop out of directing Studio Ghibli's Howl's Moving Castle, a chance to direct his first theatrical film after resigning from Toei Animation. Yuichiro Hayashi, Munehisa Sakai, and Sunghoo Park, who became MAPPA's main directors, and Sayo Yamamoto, his direct protégé at Madhouse, are also people whose talents were discovered by Maruyama. His ability to find talented people helped Madhouse and MAPPA to make great strides.

Maruyama is a regular guest at Otakon, having attended or been confirmed to attend 15 times since 2001. In 2009, the convention named him an honorary staff member.

In recognition of his contribution to the industry, he received the Special Award at the 7th Animation Kobe in 2002 and the Encouragement Award at the 23rd Fujimoto Award in 2003.

Early life
Maruyama was born in Shiogama in Miyagi Prefecture in 1941.

Maruyama graduated from Hosei University in 1963.
After hanging around for a while without a regular job, he joined Mushi Production in 1965, which a friend introduced him to.
Those were the early days of Japanese TV animation, and Mushi Pro, a pioneer in this field, was always short on staff.
It was not a job he particularly wanted, but he was fascinated by animation after experiencing culture shock by Osamu Tezuka, the head of Mushi Pro.

Career
In 1972, Maruyama left Mushi Productions, which was facing a financial crisis, to found Madhouse, along with his colleagues including Osamu Dezaki, Rintaro, and Yoshiaki Kawajiri, and in 1980, he became the president.
Since then, he has focused on planning, producing and production design for numerous Madhouse TV series, OVAs and theatrical film.
The 1993 film Jūbē Ninpūchō, for which he served as the producer, was released on video in North America under the title Ninja Scroll, and sold nearly half a million copies.

As the main producer and studio head of Madhouse, Maruyama was personally responsible for green-lighting new projects. As a result, projects were often directly pitched to him by outside interests or brought to him by creators within the company. He also had a significant amount of influence in determining the staff of these new projects, particularly in the assignment of directorial duties. In addition, he was frequently involved in the planning phase of major studio productions at Madhouse.

Maruyama has also planned and produced some of the best-known and rising films of famous directors, such as all of Satoshi Kon's films (Perfect Blue, Millennium Actress, Tokyo Godfathers, Paprika), Mamoru Hosoda's The Girl Who Leapt Through Time and Summer Wars, and Sunao Katabuchi's Mai Mai Miracle.
After the release of Paprika, Maruyama had been preparing for Satoshi Kon's next film, Dreaming Machine, but the film's production has been suspended when Kon passed away suddenly in August 2010.

In 2010, Maruyama served as the executive producer for an anime project based on the TV show Supernatural, entitled Supernatural The Animation, and is the world's first animated project from a Japanese anime studio based on an overseas drama series.

From 2010 to 2011, Iron Man, Wolverine, and Blade, three works from the Marvel Anime Project, of which Maruyama is one of the planners, were broadcast on Animax in Japan.

In June 2011, Maruyama left Madhouse and established a new animation production company, MAPPA (an acronym for Maruyama Animation Produce Project Association), at the age of 70.
MAPPA had a production room for Sunao Katabuchi's In This Corner of the World since the very beginning in 2016.
Maruyama first started working with Katabuchi for the film in 2010 during the Madhouse era, but it took three to four years to start production due to difficulties in raising funds.

Then in April 2016, Maruyama handed over the presidency of MAPPA to founding member Manabu Otsuka and newly established Studio M2, specializing in planning and pre-production.
At the age of 75, Maruyama wanted to execute at least two more big projects, so he established the studio to prepare for the execution of his projects even if he was gone.

Works

Movies

Television series

OVA and others

References

External links

 

Japanese animators
Living people
Japanese film producers
Japanese animated film producers
Japanese television producers
Madhouse (company) people
MAPPA
People from Shiogama, Miyagi
1941 births